Peter Edgecomb is an American politician from Maine. Edgecomb represented District 1 in the Maine Senate. He previously represented District 4 in the Maine House of Representatives, which was part of Aroostook County. He resides in the city of Caribou. He is a Republican and was first elected to the House in 2004. He was re-elected in  2006, 2008 and 2010 and was unable to run again for re-election in 2012 due to term limits. In 2014, Edgecomb was elected to the Senate from District 1. He announced he would not run for re-election in 2016.

Edgecomb graduated from the University of Maine in Orono in 1963. He later earned an M.A. in education at the University of New Hampshire and was a teacher and principal.

From 2010 to 2012, Edgecomb was co-chairman of the Agriculture, Conservation and Forestry Joint Standing Committee.

His grandson Anthony "A.J." Edgecomb at age 21 became a member of Maine's House of Representatives 127th Maine Legislature. He became the youngest member of Maine's House of Representatives for Maine District 148.

References

Year of birth missing (living people)
Living people
People from Caribou, Maine
Republican Party members of the Maine House of Representatives
University of Maine alumni
University of New Hampshire alumni
American school administrators
21st-century American politicians